André Léger (5 May 1896 – 9 March 1963) was a French racing cyclist. He finished in last place in the 1929 Tour de France.

References

External links

1896 births
1963 deaths
French male cyclists
Sportspeople from Aisne
Cyclists from Hauts-de-France